Antonio Mizauld (born in Montluçon in 1510 and died in Paris in 1578) was a French astronomer and physician.

Works 

 

 
 
 

 .

References

People from Montluçon
1510 births
1578 deaths
French astrologers
16th-century French astronomers
16th-century French physicians
16th-century astrologers